Hexylamine or n-hexylamine is a chemical compound with the formula CH3CH2CH2CH2CH2CH2NH2.  This colorless liquid is one of the isomeric amines of hexane.  At standard temperature and pressure, it has the ammonia/bleach odor common to amines and is soluble in almost all organic solvents.

Applications
Hexylamine is primarily of interest in surfactants, pesticides, corrosion inhibitors, dyes, rubber, emulsifiers, and pharmaceuticals.

References

Alkylamines